The 2017 Orkney Council election took place on 4 May 2017 to elect members of Orkney Islands Council. The election used the six wards created as a result of the Local Governance (Scotland) Act 2004, with each ward electing three or four Councillors using the single transferable vote system a form of proportional representation, with 21 Councillors being elected.

The Scottish Greens contested 2 wards in Orkney for the first time. Another group; the Orkney Manifesto Group, ran as a registered party for the first time, gaining the largest vote share of any party in the council's history. The OMG advocates the politicisation of the Orkney Islands Council, however is unaffiliated to any national party. The group has a Liberal-Left political outlook.

Election result

*The OMG councillors had been previously elected as Independents. 2017 was the first election they stood under the OMG slate.

Ward results

Kirkwall East
2007: 4xIndependent
2012: 4xIndependent
2017: 4xIndependent
2012–2017 change: No change

Kirkwall West & Orphir
2007: 4xIndependent
2012: 4xIndependent
2017: 3xIndependent; 1xOMG
2012–2017 change: 1 OMG gain from Independent

Stromness and South Isles
2007: 3xIndependent
2012: 3xIndependent
2017: 3xIndependent
2012–2017 change: No change

West Mainland
2007: 4xIndependent
2012: 4xIndependent
2017: 3xIndependent, 1xOMG
2012–2017 change: 1 OMG gain from Independent

East Mainland, South Ronaldsay and Burray
2007: 3xIndependent
2012: 3xIndependent
2017: 2xIndependent, 1xGreen
2012–2017 change: 1 Green gain from Independent

North Isles
2007: 3xIndependent
2012: 3xIndependent
2017: 3xIndependent
2012–2017 change: No change

Changes since 2017 Election
† North Isles Independent Cllr Kevin Woodbridge died on 19 April 2020 after a short illness. A by-election was held on 1 October 2020 and was won by Kevin Woodbridge's daughter, Heather Woodbridge.

By-elections since 2017

Footnotes

2017
2017 Scottish local elections
21st century in Orkney